The Cricovul Sărat is a left tributary of the river Prahova in Romania. It discharges into the Prahova in Adâncata. It flows through the villages Buda Crăciunești, Sângeru, Apostolache, Gornet-Cricov, Iordăcheanu, Urlați, Arioneștii Noi, Albești-Paleologu, Cioranii de Jos and Adâncata.

Tributaries

The following rivers are tributaries to the river Cricovul Sărat (from source to mouth):

Left: Lapoș, Sărățica, Crâng
Right: Salcia, Chiojdeanca, Matița, Vărbila

References

Rivers of Romania
Rivers of Buzău County
Rivers of Prahova County
Rivers of Ialomița County